Phyllalia is a genus of moths in the family Eupterotidae.

Species
 Phyllalia alboradiata Aurivillius, 1911
 Phyllalia flavicostata Fawcett, 1903
 Phyllalia patens Boisduval, 1847
 Phyllalia thunbergii Boisduval, 1847
 Phyllalia umbripennis Strand, 1911
 Phyllalia valida Felder, 1874
 Phyllalia ziczac Strand, 1911

Former species
 Phyllalia acuta Strand, 1911

References

Eupterotinae
Moth genera